Bordecorex is a village under the local government of the municipality of Caltojar, in Soria, Spain. The population in 2010 was 11.

References

Towns in Spain